Lake Khövsgöl is the largest freshwater lake in Mongolia by volume and second largest by area. It is located near the northern border of Mongolia, about 200 km (124 mi) west of the southern end of Lake Baikal. It is nicknamed the "Younger sister" of those two "sister lakes".

The lake's name is also spelled Hovsgol, Khövsgöl, or Huvsgul in English texts. It is called  Хөвсгөл нуур Hövsgöl núr in Mongolian, and is also referred to as Хөвсгөл далай Hövsgöl dalai ("Ocean Khövsgöl") or Далай ээж Dalai éj ("Ocean Mother").

Geography 
Lake Khuvsgul is located in the northwest of Mongolia near the Russian border, at the foot of the eastern Sayan Mountains. It is the second-most voluminous freshwater lake in Asia, and holds almost 70% of Mongolia's fresh water and 0.4% of all the fresh water in the world. The town of Hatgal lies at the southern end of the lake.

Lake Khuvsgul's watershed is relatively small, and it has only small tributaries. It is drained at the southern end by the Egiin Gol, which connects to the Selenge and ultimately flows into Lake Baikal. Its location in northern Mongolia forms one part of the southern border of the great Siberian taiga forest, where the dominant tree is the Siberian larch (Larix sibirica),

The lake is surrounded by several mountain ranges. The highest mountain is the Bürenkhaan / Mönkh Saridag, whose peak, north of the lake, lies exactly on the Russian-Mongolian border. The lake freezes over completely in winter, and the ice cover is strong enough to carry heavy trucks; transport routes on its surface offer shortcuts to the normal roads. However, this practice is now forbidden, to prevent pollution of the lake from both oil leaks and trucks breaking through the ice. An estimated 30–40 vehicles have broken through the ice into the lake over the years.

There is a roughly elliptical island in the middle of the lake, named Wooden Boy Island, measuring 3 km east–west and 2 km north–south. It is located about 11 km from the lake's eastern shore, and 50 km north of the town of Hatgal.

Ecological significance 

Khuvsgul is one of  seventeen ancient lakes in the world, being more than 2 million years old, and the most pristine (apart from Lake Vostok), as well as being the most significant drinking water reserve of Mongolia. Its water is potable without any treatment.  Hovsgol is an ultraoligotrophic lake with low levels of nutrients, primary productivity and high water clarity (Secchi depths > 18 m are common).  Hovsgol's fish community is species-poor compared to that of Lake Baikal.  Species of commercial and recreational interest include Eurasian perch (Perca fluviatilis), burbot (Lota lota), lenok (Brachymystax lenok), and the endangered endemic Hovsgol grayling (Thymallus nigrescens).  Though endangered by poaching during its spawning runs, the Hovsgol grayling is still abundant throughout much of the lake.

The Lake area is a National Park bigger than Yellowstone and strictly protected as a transition zone between Central Asian Steppe and the Siberian Taiga.  Despite Hovsgol's protected status, illegal fishing is common and prohibitions against commercial fishing with gillnets are seldom enforced.  The lake is traditionally considered sacred in a land suffering from arid conditions where most lakes are salty.

The Park is home to a variety of wildlife such as ibex, argali, elk, wolf, wolverine, musk deer, brown bear, Siberian moose, and sable.

The Hövsgöl (Khövsgöl) Long-term Ecological Research Site (LTERS) was established in 1997 and an extensive research program began soon thereafter. Now part of an international network of long-term study sites, the Hövsgöl LTERS provides a stage for nurturing Mongolia's scientific and environmental infrastructures, studying climate change, and developing sustainable responses to some of environmental challenges facing the lake and its watershed.

Recent studies has identified high levels of plastic pollution (esp. microplastics) in the lake, showing that even small rural populations can cause high plastics pollution levels, as high as elsewhere around the world.

Etymology and transliterations

The name Khövsgöl is derived from Turkic words for "Khob Su Kol, means Lake with Great water" Göl is the Turkic word for "lake" and today the Mongolian word for river. There are a number of different transcription variants, depending on whether the Cyrillic "х" is transliterated to "h" or "kh," or whether the  "ө" is transliterated to "ö," "o," or "u." Transcriptions from the name in the classical Mongolian script, like Hubsugul, Khubsugul etc. may also be seen.

References

External links

 New York Times article about kayaking on Khövsgöl
Limnological Catalog of Mongolian Lakes

Ancient lakes
Rift lakes
Lakes of Mongolia
Khövsgöl Province
World Heritage Tentative List